Kaarlo Eino "Stigi" Saastamoinen (9 October 1887 – 4 December 1946) was a Finnish gymnast. He was the flag bearer for Finland at the 1912 Summer Olympics, where he won a team silver medal.

References

1887 births
1946 deaths
Sportspeople from Helsinki
People from Uusimaa Province (Grand Duchy of Finland)
Finnish male artistic gymnasts
Gymnasts at the 1912 Summer Olympics
Olympic gymnasts of Finland
Olympic silver medalists for Finland
Olympic medalists in gymnastics
Medalists at the 1912 Summer Olympics
20th-century Finnish people